La Covacha, was a high-end international restaurant, nightclub, and live concert venue in Miami, Florida, United States. Teresa and Aurelio Rodriguez opened the venue in 1989 as a cafeteria. A year later Aurelio created the nightclub and live music venue. Now permanently closed.

History 

After La Covacha burned down in 1999, Aurelio and architect William Lane redesigned the club.

Live music venue 
Many artists have performed live at La Covacha, including: 
Nicky Jam
Los Amigos Invisibles
Joe Arroyo
Aterciopelados
Bacilos
Cabas
Calle 13
Jorge Celedón
Willie Colón
Silvestre Dangond
Los Enanitos Verdes
Fonseca
Charly García
Oscar D'León
Víctor Manuelle
Gian Marco
La Oreja de Van Gogh
Orishas
Los Prisioneros
Richie Ray & Bobby Cruz
Franco de Vita
Los Hermanos Zuleta

Controversies 
La Covacha has had several controversies, including the Elba Morales commission campaign checks scandal and the presentation of Cuban artist Paulito FG, a concert that drew protests from the Cuban-American community in Miami.

References

 Leland, John and Chambers, Veronica (July 12, 1999) Generation Ñ. Newsweek.
 Fraser Delgado, Celeste (February 11, 2006) La Covacha’s Barranquilla Carnaval Can Offer Only Memories. Miami Sun Post.
 Korman, Nina (August 3, 2000) Rocking On. Miami New Times.
 Cantor, Judy (August 25, 1995) Nightclub Jitters. Miami New Times.

External links
Official Site
New York Times Review
CoolJunkie Review CoolJunkie.com
La Covacha on nocheLatina

Restaurants in Miami
Restaurants established in 1989
1989 establishments in Florida